Qorutak (also Romanized as Qorūtak; also known as Gūrūtag, Mīāndār-e Qortak, and Mīāndār-e Qūrtak) is a village in Vizhenan Rural District, in the Central District of Gilan-e Gharb County, Kermanshah Province, Iran. At the 2006 census, its population was 69, in 17 families.

References 

Populated places in Gilan-e Gharb County